Carolyn Cannuscio is an American epidemiologist who is an associate professor at the Perelman School of Medicine. She serves as Director of Research for the Center for Public Health Initiatives. Cannuscio works to improve public health with a specific focus on disadvantaged urban populations.

Early life and education 
Cannuscio was an undergraduate student at Brown University, where she studied health and society. She graduated in 1992 and switched her focus to social epidemiology. She joined the Harvard T.H. Chan School of Public Health for her doctoral studies, where she investigated whether caregiving was hazardous to the health of women. After earning her doctorate, Cannuscio joined Merck Group as an epidemiologist. She was appointed the Robert Wood Johnson Health & Society Scholar at the Perelman School of Medicine in 2006.

Research and career 
In 2007, Cannuscio joined the faculty at the University of Pennsylvania. Based at the Perelman School of Medicine, Cannuscio has continued to work on epidemiology and health disparities. She has concentrated her efforts on the health of people in Philadelphia, which is the poorest of the largest cities in United States. In an attempt to improve public health, Cannuscio has worked with the Free Library of Philadelphia and the Mural Arts Program.

Cannuscio has been part of several projects to improve the evidence-base relating to national public health challenges, including the opioid epidemic, food insecurity and food allergies. She was made Director of Research at the Center for Public Health Initiatives in 2016. She also serves as a member of the Penn Institute for Urban Research.

Cannuscio provided expert commentary to the public throughout the COVID-19 pandemic. Cannuscio investigated how people in the United States felt about sharing health data for controlling the spread of COVID-19 (i.e. contact tracing apps). She showed that white conservatives were less likely than liberals or racial minorities to support digital data usage for COVID-19 monitoring. During 2021, Cannuscio studied effective strategies to improve COVID-19 vaccine uptake. By the summer, vaccine supply was exceeding demand, and less than half of Americans had received one dose of the COVID-19 vaccine. She argued that whilst incentives such as cash or free food/drinks may provide a short-term bump, alternate strategies were essential to increase population immunity. These approaches had to address safety concerns (for example, those of pregnant women) and systemic racism within the medical community. She believed that organizations must mandate vaccines for their employees, that activities that involve close contact should only involve vaccinated people (for example, entry to restaurants, gyms) and that health insurance premiums should be increased for people who are unvaccinated. She believed that the pandemic heightened health anxiety and caused people to experience "anticipatory regret," the fear that you may cause harm to others by infecting them with COVID-19.

Cannuscio recommended people wear N95 respirator masks if they had to socialize, but to stay home if possible.

Selected publications

References 

American women epidemiologists
American epidemiologists
Living people
Year of birth missing (living people)
Brown University alumni
Perelman School of Medicine at the University of Pennsylvania faculty
21st-century women physicians
Harvard School of Public Health alumni